PGA Tour 2K21 is a sports video game developed by HB Studios and published by 2K Sports for Stadia, Microsoft Windows, Nintendo Switch, PlayStation 4 and Xbox One. It is the fourth installment of the PGA Tour 2K series, the first game in the series to be released under the PGA Tour 2K name and the second game in the overall series to be licensed by the PGA Tour. 

PGA Tour 2K21 received generally favorable reviews, with critics feeling that the game preserved the realism of its predecessors, while adding more difficulty levels and assists to make it more accessible to a wider audience.

The game has sold around 3 million units, as of May 2022.

Course list

Real courses 
Atlantic Beach Country Club
Detroit Golf Club
Bay Hill Club and Lodge
East Lake Golf Club
Innisbrook Resort and Golf Club (Copperhead Course)
Quail Hollow Club
Riviera Country Club
TPC Boston
TPC Deere Run
TPC Louisiana
TPC River Highlands
TPC San Antonio
TPC Sawgrass
TPC Scottsdale
TPC Southwind
TPC Summerlin
TPC Twin Cities

Official fictional PGA Tour 2K21 courses 
Caramel Creek
Cloudcrest Country Club
The Club at Ravenswood
Conservatory Club (U.S. Open); fictional name Northwest Open
Copper Dunes
Craigendoran Links (The Open Championship); fictional name The Royal Championship
Emerald Lake GC
Faxon Park Golf Club
Hickory Creek GC
Hoophole River Club (The Masters); fictional name The Legends Championship
The House on The Cliff
The Jumeriah Club (Dubai)
Katagawa Country Club
The Links at Royal Atlantic
Monte Cervino
McCory Shores Golf Club (California)
Ocean of Memories
Pearl Mountain Golf Course
Quincy Downs Country Club
Royal Ethalwind (Nova Scotia, Canada)
Tarwa Golf Club
Timber Knoll
Vaquero Valley Golf Course (PGA Championship); fictional name The Golf Club Championship
Victory Village

Reception

PGA Tour 2K21 received "generally favorable reviews" on all platforms, except for the Nintendo Switch and PC versions which received "mixed or average reviews", according to review aggregator Metacritic.

Owen S. Good of Polygon felt that the game addressed almost all of his criticisms of The Golf Club 2019, and that its assists "[gave] me the certainty of knowing that when my shot goes awry, I did something wrong. Moreover, I know what I did wrong, and the game no longer feels arbitrary or punitive."

Tristan Ogilvie of IGN similarly noted that given the reputation of The Golf Club as being an "uncompromisingly hardcore simulation" of golf (to the point that comparisons were made to FromSoftware games), the difficulty modes and assist options allowed players to achieve a more balanced experience. Among criticisms were its "static" environments, a lack of any women's tour or tournament options, such as LPGA events, or any licensed female players (although female golfers can still be created), the included PGA Tour characters not being playable, as well as levelling and rival systems that felt "arbitrary". In conclusion, it was felt that the game as a whole was the "most flexible and enjoyable golf game since EA’s Tiger Woods series was at its peak".

Barring "minor annoyances" such as its handling of rough, repetitive commentary, none of the tour professionals being playable in-game, and its use of micro-transactions, GameSpot felt that PGA Tour 2K21 was "the most realistic and pure golf experience in a game to date", preserving key aspects of The Golf Club while making it more accessible to a wider variety of players.

References

External links

2020 video games
2K Sports games
Golf video games
HB Studios games
Multiplayer and single-player video games
Nintendo Switch games
PlayStation 4 games
Sports video games with career mode
Stadia games
Video games developed in Canada
Windows games
Xbox One games